Ab Neyeh (also Romanized as Āb Neyeh, Āb Neyh, and Āb Nīyeh; also known as Ābīān, Avban, and Āvyān) is a village in Bala Velayat Rural District, Bala Velayat District, Bakharz County, Razavi Khorasan Province, Iran. At the 2006 census, its population was 1,052, in 260 families.

See also 

 List of cities, towns and villages in Razavi Khorasan Province

References 

Populated places in Bakharz County